Hin Leong Trading is a commodity trading corporation registered and headquartered in Singapore that was founded in 1963 by Lim Oon Kuin. One of Singapore's largest independent oil traders, Hin Leong filed for bankruptcy protection in April 2020.

Operations
In December 2010, Hin Leong announced plans to build Singapore's fourth oil refinery. In 2014, the company announced plans to file for an initial public offering (IPO) but cancelled those plans by the end of the same year.

Bankruptcy
When the outbreak of SARS-CoV-2 in Wuhan, China was first announced, Lim believed that the Chinese government would effectively contain it and therefore made the "quintessential Hin Leong play" of betting that oil prices would rise as a result of a recovering demand for oil. However, as the coronavirus crisis worsened into a pandemic and amidst plunging crude oil prices, the company faced pressure to make partial loan repayments amounting to billions of dollars; despite selling off oil pledged as collateral, the company was still unable to raise enough money to pay down its loans. In a meeting with its lenders, Lim revealed that the company had written off $800 million in futures trading losses, although it had declared a revenue of $20 billion and a net income of close to $80 million in the 2019 financial year.

The company owed some $3.85 billion to 23 lenders, the biggest of which being HSBC which held $600 million of Hin Leong's debt. Singapore's three largest banks also faced significant debt exposure to Hin Leong; UOB was owed $100 million, whereas OCBC and DBS Bank had exposures of $200 million and $290 million respectively. Having initially filed for bankruptcy protection under Section 211B of Singapore's Companies Act with the High Court of Singapore on 17 April 2020, Hin Leong subsequently sought for "judicial management" under independent accounting firm PricewaterhouseCoopers (PwC), which would oversee the restructuring of Hin Leong's debt. The bid was approved on 27 April.

Lim resigned from Hin Leong on 17 April while stating that he wished for his children to remain as directors of the company. On 21 April, the Singapore Police Force confirmed that an investigation of Hin Leong was underway. Lim was charged with forgery on 14 August.

In a joint statement, the Monetary Authority of Singapore (MAS), Enterprise Singapore (ESG) and the Maritime and Port Authority of Singapore (MPA) said that they were also "closely monitoring developments related to the firm and the broader oil trading and bunkering sectors".

References

1963 establishments in Singapore
Oil traders
Singaporean companies established in 1963
Non-renewable resource companies established in 1963
Energy companies of Singapore